Padhraic Smyth is a Professor of Computer Science in UC Irvine's Donald Bren School of Information and Computer Sciences. He also serves as Director of UC Irvine's Data Science Initiative and Associate Director for UC Irvine's Center for Machine Learning and Intelligent Systems. He was elected a fellow of the Association for the Advancement of Artificial Intelligence in 2010 "for significant contributions to the theory and practice of statistical machine learning".

References

External links

Living people
University of California, Irvine faculty
American computer scientists
Fellows of the Association for the Advancement of Artificial Intelligence
1962 births